Anaspis is a large genus of beetles belonging to the family Scraptiidae. These small beetles are sometimes falsely called tumbling flower beetles (Family:Mordellidae) as they occur in large numbers on flowers and have a habit of tumbling to the ground when disturbed. They do not have a vernacular common name, but some recent authors have coined the name, false flower beetles.

Species

Species include:

Anaspis abollata
Anaspis akaira
Anaspis apfelbecki
Anaspis arctica
Anaspis atrata
Anaspis balthasari
Anaspis beardsleyi
Anaspis bernhaueri
Anaspis bernikovi
Anaspis bilaciniata
Anaspis bohemica
Anaspis brevicornis
Anaspis brunnipes
Anaspis canariensis
Anaspis cavipalpis
Anaspis chevrolati
Anaspis collaris
Anaspis corcyrica
Anaspis costai
Anaspis curtii
Anaspis cypria
Anaspis dichroa
Anaspis distinguenda
Anaspis duryi
Anaspis eversi
Anaspis excellens
Anaspis fasciata
Anaspis flava
Anaspis flavipennis
Anaspis florenceae
Anaspis frontalis
Anaspis ganglbaueri
Anaspis garneysi
Anaspis graeca
Anaspis helvetica
Anaspis hispanica
Anaspis horni
Anaspis hudsoni
Anaspis humerosa
Anaspis imitator
Anaspis incognita
Anaspis insularis
Anaspis kiesenwetteri
Anaspis kochi
Anaspis labiata
Anaspis latipalpis
Anaspis latiuscula
Anaspis lindbergi
Anaspis lucana
Anaspis lurida
Anaspis luteobrunea
Anaspis mancinii
Anaspis marginicollis
Anaspis mariae
Anaspis melanopa
Anaspis melanostoma
Anaspis militaris
Anaspis mulsanti
Anaspis nigrina
Anaspis nigripes
Anaspis olympiae
Anaspis ornata
Anaspis palpalis
Anaspis poggi
Anaspis proteus
Anaspis pulicaria
Anaspis pyranaea
Anaspis quadrimaculata
Anaspis rambouseki
Anaspis rayi
Anaspis regimbarti
Anaspis revelieri
Anaspis rufa
Anaspis ruficollis
Anaspis rufilabris
Anaspis rufitarsis
Anaspis schneideri
Anaspis seposita
Anaspis septentrionalis
Anaspis serbica
Anaspis sericea
Anaspis setulosa
Anaspis silvatica
Anaspis steppensis
Anaspis stierlini
Anaspis stussineri
Anaspis subtilis
Anaspis suturalis
Anaspis testacea
Anaspis thoracica
Anaspis thoracoxantha
Anaspis trifasciata
Anaspis truquii
Anaspis varians
Anaspis versicolor
Anaspis viennensis

References

Tenebrionoidea genera
Scraptiidae